The Jalandhar–Jammu line is a railway line connecting  and  in the Indian state of Punjab with  in Jammu and Kashmir. The line is under the administrative jurisdiction of Northern Railway. This line was made after Indian Independence in 1947. Normally before partition of India and creation of Pakistan, trains to Jammu Tawi from Delhi used to run via Panipat, Ludhiana, Jalandhar City, Amritsar, Lahore, Narowal and Sialkot. But after partition and creation of Pakistan in 1947, the Sialkot–Jammu Tawi line was dismantled and closed permanently. Jammu and Kashmir became cut off from rest of India. Hence in 1949, it was decided to extend the line from Jalandhar City to Mukerian till Pathankot and after the Indo-Pakistani War of 1965, this line was extended to Jammu Tawi. This  railway line is an important strategic connectivity for Indian Military and Defence.

History
The line from Jalandhar City to Mukerian City was constructed in 1915. The Mukerian city to Pathankot jn  line was built in 1952. The construction of the Pathankot–Jammu Tawi line was initiated in 1965, after the Indo-Pakistani War of 1965, and opened in 1971. Railway tracks between Jalandhar and Jammu Tawi have been doubled. Electrification of railway track between Jalandhar and Jammu Tawi was completed in 2014.

Speed limit
The Jammu–Jalandhar Cantonment line is classified as a "Group B" line and can take speeds up to 130 km/h.

Passenger movement
Jalandhar City and Jammu Tawi, on this line, are amongst the top hundred booking stations of Indian Railway.

DMU shed
India's first and largest DMU shed at Jalandhar holds 90 units placed in service in rural Punjab. It also houses two BEML-built rail buses which operate on the Beas–Goindwal Sahib line.

Loco sheds
Jammu has a trip shed for visiting locos where WDS-4 locos belonging to Shakurbasti shed  are retained  for long periods. Pathankot Cantonment (Chakki Bank) had a steam shed which has now been decommissioned. Jalandhar City and Ludhiana have Electric Loco Sheds.

Bridges 
There are many major and minor bridges in the Jalandhar City–Jammu Tawi line. The most important bridges are the -long Beas River Bridge at Mirthal, the -long Chakki River Bridge at Pathankot, the -long Ravi River Bridge at Madhopur, the -long Bridge on Degh Nalah at Ghagwal, the -long Bridge on Basantar River at Samba and the -long bridge on River Unjh at Vijaypur Jammu.

Railway reorganisation
Sind Railway (later reorganised as Scinde, Punjab & Delhi Railway) was formed a guaranteed railway in 1856. It constructed broad-gauge railways from Delhi to Multan via Lahore, and from Karachi to Kotri. Multan and Kotri were connected by ferry service on the Indus River. In 1871–72, Indus Valley Railway was formed to connect Multan and Kotri. At the same time, Punjab Northern State Railway started constructing from Lahore towards Peshawar. In 1886, Sind, Punjab and Delhi Railway was acquired by the state and amalgamated with Indus Valley Railway and Punjab Northern State Railway to form North-Western State Railway.
  
With the partition of India in 1947, North Western Railway was split. While the western portion became Pakistan West Railway, and later Pakistan Railways, the eastern part became Eastern Punjab Railway. In 1952, Northern Railway was formed with a portion of East Indian Railway Company west of Mughalsarai, Jodhpur Railway, Bikaner Railway and Eastern Punjab Railway.

References

External links
 Trains at Jalandhar Cantonment
 Trains at Mukerian
 Trains at Pathankot Junction
 Trains at Jammu Tawi

Rail transport in Punjab, India
Rail transport in Jammu and Kashmir
Railway lines opened in 1971
5 ft 6 in gauge railways in India
Transport in Jalandhar
Transport in Jammu